Greer Lankton (April 21, 1958 – November 18, 1996), was an American artist known for creating lifelike sewn dolls that were often modeled on friends or celebrities and posed in elaborate theatrical settings. She was a key figure in the East Village art scene of the 1980s in New York.

Early life
Greer Lankton was born in Flint, Michigan, to a Presbyterian minister and his wife. It was during her rough childhood as a "feminine boy" that she began creating dolls. "It was when I was about ten years old ... I used to make dolls out of hollyhocks and all types of flowers. Pipe cleaner dolls and things like that. I started taking it seriously by the time I went to college when I was 17." Lankton was often teased by peers, and on more than one occasion experienced physical harassment.

Lankton studied at the Art Institute of Chicago and later Pratt Institute in New York. She changed her name and had gender affirmation surgery at the age of 21, while she was a student at Pratt.  Lankton's father Bill convinced the church's board to cover Greer's surgery under the church's health insurance. She had previously been the subject of a local newspaper article about people transitioning to a new gender.

Work

Lankton said in interviews that the surgery "made me focus on bodies. I was always thinking about bodies, and if you think you have the wrong body, you're always going to think about it."

Gender and sexuality are recurring themes in Lankton's art. Her dolls are created in the likeness of those society calls "freaks", and have often been compared to the surrealist works of Hans Bellmer, who made surreal dolls with interchangeable limbs. She created figures that were simultaneously distressing and glamorous, as if they were both victim and perpetrator of their existence.

In 1981, Lankton was featured in the seminal "New York/New Wave" exhibition at P.S.1 in Long Island City and began to show her work in the East Village at Civilian Warfare, where she had solo shows in 1983, 1984, and 1985. She gained an almost cult following among East Village residents from her highly theatrical window displays she designed for Einstein's, the boutique run by her husband, Paul Monroe, at 96 East Seventh Street.

Besides her more emotionally charged dolls, Lankton also created commissioned portrait dolls. These include a 1989 doll of Diana Vreeland that was commissioned for a window display at Barney's as well as shrines to her icons, such as Candy Darling.

Critic Roberta Smith described her works in the New York Times as: "Beautifully sewn, with extravagant clothes, make-up and hairstyles, they were at once glamorous and grotesque and exuded intense, Expressionistic personalities that reminded some observers of Egon Schiele. They presaged many of the concerns of '90s art, including the emphasis on the body, sexuality, fashion and, in their resemblance to puppets, performance."

Photographer Nan Goldin said "Greer was one of the pioneers who blurred the line between folk art and fine art." She appeared in Goldin's 1995 film "I'll Be Your Mirror." She also had work in the prestigious Whitney Biennial and the Venice Biennale, both in 1995, where her busts of Candy Darling, circus fat ladies, and dismembered heads gained her notoriety.

In November 2014, "LOVE ME," a major exhibition of Lankton's work including more than 90 dolls, documentation, and ephemera was mounted at PARTICIPANT, INC in New York City. It was organized by Lia Gangitano in cooperation with the Greer Lankton Archives Museum (G.L.A.M.), which was founded by Paul Monroe after Lankton's death.

Personal life
Lankton began studying at the Pratt Institute in New York City in 1978. Lankton was friends with photographer Nan Goldin and lived in Goldin's apartment in the early 1980s, often posing for her. She also played muse to photographers including David Wojnarowicz and Peter Hujar.

Lankton married designer Paul Monroe in 1987 in New York City. Nan Goldin was their wedding photographer. Greer and Paul met in 1981 introduced by Peter Hujar who was later Paul's best man at their wedding. They started dating in 1982 and then lived together from 1984 to 1992, when Greer went to rehab in the mid west. Paul Monroe opened his shop EINSTEINS at 34 east 7th street NYC in 1981 and in 1983 Greer joined him as a partner. In 1986 Greer opened up her own gallery THE DOLL CLUB in EINSTEINS. Lankton's window installations at Einstein's put the store on the map, but the store closed in 1992.

Lankton struggled with drug addiction and anorexia for many years. She died on November 18, 1996, of a drug overdose in her Chicago apartment, just a month after completing her final and largest work. Titled It's All About Me, Not You, this last work has become a permanent installation at the Mattress Factory in Pittsburgh.

References

External links 
 Greer Lankton, a Memoir by Julia Morton from ArtNet.com

1958 births
1996 deaths
American artists
American LGBT artists
Transgender artists
Transgender women
Pratt Institute alumni
School of the Art Institute of Chicago alumni
Artists from Michigan
LGBT people from Michigan
LGBT people from New York (state)
People from Flint, Michigan
Drug-related deaths in Illinois
20th-century American LGBT people
Inductees of the Chicago LGBT Hall of Fame